Balouzat is a synonym or alternative name for several wine grape varieties including:

Bequignol noir
Hourca
Malbec
Merille